The 1895–96 season was the 25th season of competitive football in England.

Events
Loughborough replaced Walsall Town Swifts in the Second Division.

Honours

Notes = Number in parentheses is the times that club has won that honour. * indicates new record for competition

League table

First Division

Second Division

Southern Football League

Division One

Division Two

References